MOS:EM may refer to:

 Wikipedia:Manual of Style#Dashes (MOS:EMDASH)
 Wikipedia:Manual of Style/Text formatting#Emphasis (MOS:EMPHASIS)